Sakhiabad (also Romanized as Sakhīābād) is a village in Pishkuh-e Mugui Rural District, in the Central District of Fereydunshahr County, Isfahan Province, Iran. At the 2006 census, its population was 49, in 10 families.

References 

Populated places in Fereydunshahr County